Events in the year 1867 in Peru.

Incumbents
President: Mariano Ignacio Prado

Events
Peruvian Civil War of 1867

Births

Deaths
May 30 - Ramón Castilla

 
1860s in Peru